The 2023 UCI Mountain Bike season is the eightteenth season of the UCI Mountain Bike season. The 2023 season began on 14 January with the Israel Cup in Israel and ends in December 2023.

Events

January

February

March

April

May

BMX Events

January

February

March

2023 BMX World Cup

2023 Greek National XCO Cup

2023 Portuguese National XCM Cup

2023 Portuguese National Downhill Cup 
{| class="wikitable sortable" style="font-size:85%;"
!style="width:190px;"|Date !!style="width:210px;"|Race Name !!style="width:210px;"|Location !!style="width:170px;"|Class !!width=200px|Winner !!style="width:170px;"|Second !!style="width:170px;"|Third !!style="width:170px;"|Ref
|-
|18–19 March ||2ª Taça de Portugal DHI C2|| Seia||align=center|NC||  ||  ||  ||align=center|
|

2023 Spanish National Cup XCO

2023 Spanish National Cup XCM

2022–2023 Auscycling Mountain Bike National Series – DHI Final Ranking

General classification

2022–2023 Israel Cup Final Ranking

General classification

National Championships

XCO

XCC

XCE

XCM

Downhill

Enduro

Pump Track

E–MTB

XCR

BMX

References

UCI Mountain Bike World Cup
season
Mountain biking